The End of the End may refer to:
 "The End of the End", a song by Paul McCartney from his 2007 album Memory Almost Full
 "The End of the End", a song by the Orb from their 2018 album No Sounds Are Out of Bounds
 Black Sabbath: The End of the End, a 2017 film documenting Black Sabbath's final concert performance

See also
 The End (disambiguation)
 The End of the Beginning (disambiguation)